The Big Diamond Robbery is a 1929 American silent Western film directed by Eugene Forde and starring Tom Mix, Kathryn McGuire and Frank Beal. It was the last of five films Mix made for the FBO studios, and his last silent film. Unlike many of his westerns, it has a contemporary setting in 1920s Arizona.

Cast
 Tom Mix as Tom Markham  
 Kathryn McGuire as Ellen Brooks  
 Frank Beal as George Brooks  
 Martha Mattox as Aunt Effie  
 Ernest Hilliard as Rodney Stevens  
 Barney Furey as Barney McGill  
 Ethan Laidlaw as Chick

References

Bibliography 
 Jensen, Richard D. The Amazing Tom Mix: The Most Famous Cowboy of the Movies. 2005.

External links 
 

1929 Western (genre) films
Films directed by Eugene Forde
1929 films
American black-and-white films
Film Booking Offices of America films
Films set in Arizona
Silent American Western (genre) films
1920s English-language films
1920s American films